Erigeron inornatus is a North American species of flowering plant in the family Asteraceae known by the common name California rayless daisy,  California rayless fleabane, rayless fleabane, Lava rayless fleabane

Erigeron inornatus is native to the western United States, primarily in the mountains of Oregon and California but with additional populations in Washington, Idaho, and Nevada.

Erigeron inornatus is a perennial herb variable in appearance, up to 90 cm (3 feet) tall, with hairy or hairless foliage. The leaves extend all the way up the stem and are narrow and several centimeters long. Atop each branch of the stem is an inflorescence of 1-15 flower heads, each about a centimeter (0.4 inches) wide and flat-topped. Each head contains numerous golden yellow to wispy white disc florets but no ray florets.

Varieties
Erigeron inornatus var. inornatus - California, Nevada, Oregon, Idaho, Washington
Erigeron inornatus var. calidipetris G.Nesom - California from Siskiyou Co to Plumas Co
Erigeron inornatus var. keilii G.Nesom - California in Fresno Co + Tulare Co

References

External links
Jepson Manual Treatment
United States Department of Agriculture Plants Profile
Calphotos Photo gallery, University of California

inornatus
Plants described in 1876
Flora of the Western United States
Flora without expected TNC conservation status